Kanaka Gulch is a valley in the U.S. state of Oregon.

Kanaka Gulch was named for the Kanaka people who were employed in the local mining industry.

References

Landforms of Jackson County, Oregon
Valleys of Oregon